Greenon Local School District is a school district in Clark County, Ohio, United States. Formerly known as "Mad River-Green Local School District", the name reflected the cooperation between Mad River and Green Townships in not just education but also police, fire, and emergency services. The current name reflects the name of Green Township and the village of Enon, which is the "seat" of Mad River Township.  The name was changed to distinguish this school district from Mad River Local Schools in Montgomery County, Ohio.  The school district operates Enon Elementary, Indian Valley Middle School, and Greenon High School. The main office is located in Enon, Ohio.

External links
 Greenon Local Schools

Education in Clark County, Ohio
School districts in Ohio